Gourmet is a cultural ideal associated with the culinary arts of fine food and drink.

Gourmet may also refer to:



Restaurants 

 Gourmet Room or Gourmet Restaurant, a Cincinnati fine-dining restaurant

Companies
Gourmet (supermarket), a Hong Kong supermarket
Gourmet Foods, a Pakistani bakery and confectionery chain

Media
Gourmet (magazine), a defunct food and wine magazine (1941–2009)
Gourmet (TV series), a 2008 South Korean TV series

People
François Gourmet (born 1982), a Belgian decathlete
Olivier Gourmet (born 1963), a Belgian actor

Other uses
Gourmet Museum and Library, a Belgian museum

See also